Durobrivae may refer to:

Durobrivae, the Roman town of Water Newton in Cambridgeshire, England
Durobrivae Cantiacorum, the Roman settlement at Rochester, Kent, in England

See also
 Durobrivis